Whitney Paul (born October 8, 1953) was an American football outside linebacker in the NFL for the Kansas City Chiefs and New Orleans Saints. He played college football at the University of Colorado. 

1953 births
Living people
American football linebackers
Colorado Buffaloes football players
New Orleans Saints players
Kansas City Chiefs players